Arrigo Bocchi (c.1871 – ?) was a British-Italian film director and producer of the silent era. After the First World War Bocchi worked for Windsor Films at the Catford Studios in London as well as shooting films on location in Italy.

Selected filmography

Producer
 Disraeli (1916)
 The Black Night (1916)
 A King of the People (1917)
 Ora Pro Nobis (1917)

Director
 The Slave (1918)
 Not Guilty (1919)
 The Polar Star (1919)

References

Bibliography
 Low, Rachael. The History of the British Film 1918–1929. George Allen & Unwin, 1971.

External links

Year of death unknown
1870s births
Italian film directors
Italian film producers
British film directors
British film producers
Italian emigrants to the United Kingdom